George Anthony Devolder Santos (born July 22, 1988) is an American politician who is the U.S. representative for , serving since 2023. A member of the Republican Party, Santos was elected to Congress in 2022, after running unsuccessfully in 2020 against incumbent Thomas Suozzi. Santos is the first LGBT non-incumbent Republican elected to federal office.

Santos has made numerous false or dubious claims about his biography, work history, criminal record, financial status, ethnicity, religion, and other matters, both in public and in private. Six weeks after his election, numerous news outlets reported that large parts of his self-published biography appeared to be fabricated, including claims about his ancestry, education, employment, charity work, property ownership, and crimes he claimed to be a victim of. Santos has admitted to lying about his education and employment. As of March 2023, he is under investigation by U.S. federal, New York state, and Nassau County authorities.

 In 2010, Santos confessed to having committed check fraud in Brazil in 2008, but he failed to appear in court in 2011, leaving the case unresolved. In the wake of his election, Brazilian authorities revived the case in late 2022. In addition, there have been several judgments against Santos in the United States concerning eviction and personal debt cases. In 2022, he was accused of failing to pay thousands of dollars in judgments from the 2010s, to which he admitted. Santos was charged in 2017 in the United States for theft by deception regarding bad checks to dog breeders, but the charges were dropped, and the record expunged in 2021 after the signatures on the checks did not match his.

Despite numerous calls for his resignation from members of both major political parties, Santos has refused. On March 14, 2023, Santos filed paperwork to run for reelection in 2024.

Early life and education
Santos was born on July 22, 1988, to Fátima Aziza Caruso Horta Devolder and Gercino António dos Santos Jr. (known as Junior), both of whom were born in Brazil. His maternal grandparents, Paulo Horta Devolder and Rosalina Caruso Horta Devolder, were also born in Brazil. Three of his four maternal great-grandparents were also born in Brazil, with the other born in Belgium in 1863 and immigrating to Brazil in 1884.

Fátima Devolder immigrated to Florida as a migrant worker to pick beans in 1985. She later moved to New York City and worked as a housekeeper, cook, and nanny. Junior Santos worked as a house painter. George Santos has claimed dual citizenship in the United States and Brazil through his parents. In 2013, a Brazilian court described him as an American. He has a younger sister, Tiffany Lee Devolder Santos.

Tiffany Bogosian, a New York personal-injury lawyer who knew Santos in childhood and who later helped him get theft charges expunged, attended junior high school with him. She recalls that his family was not well off, he learned English as he grew up, and was bullied at school. Santos holds a GED (Certificate of High School Equivalency). He attended Intermediate School 125 (also known as I.S. 125 Thomas J. McCann Woodside Intermediate School) in Woodside, Queens and Primary School 122 (also known as P.S.122 The Mamie Fay School) in Astoria, Queens.

Santos moved to Brazil, where his mother was at the time, around 2008 and lived there until 2011. Two former acquaintances said that he competed as a drag queen in Brazilian beauty pageants in 2008 using the drag name Kitara Ravache, with one saying that Santos began dressing in drag in the municipality of Niterói, in the Rio de Janeiro Metropolitan Area, in 2005. A journalist, João Fragah, has said he interviewed Santos on video performing as Kitara Ravache. The Brazilian news program Fantástico published a video purportedly of Santos dancing in drag at Niterói's 2007 gay parade; Fantástico cited digital crimes expert Wanderson Castilho confirming that this person was Santos. A Wikipedia user called "Anthonydevolder" (one of Santos's aliases) wrote about himself on the site in 2011, giving Santos's birth date, describing a similar family background, stating that at 17 he had been a drag queen in a gay nightclub and had won several gay beauty pageants, and identifying three supposed television and movie acting credits. On January 19, 2023, Santos denied having been a drag queen, calling the allegations "categorically false" and accusing the media of making "outrageous claims about my life"; two days later, he said, "I was young and I had fun at a festival."

Early career 

While Santos lived in Brazil, an acquaintance paid him and his mother to play bingo, which was illegal gambling. He left Brazil while a check fraud case against him there was ongoing and moved to New York City. From October 2011 to July 2012, Santos worked as a customer service representative at a call center for Dish Network in College Point, Queens.

The New York Times verified that, sometime after 2013, Santos worked for HotelsPro, a subsidiary of Istanbul, Turkey-headquartered MetGlobal. In early 2016, Santos moved to Orlando, Florida, where HotelsPro was opening an office.  He registered to vote and changed his driver's license to his Florida residence.

Beginning in 2017, using the name George Devolder, Santos worked in an unconfirmed capacity for LinkBridge Investors, a small company that "hosts closed-door conferences" for investors. His 2019 campaign disclosure form and a company document list him as a vice president, but that same year the company president testified in a lawsuit that he was a freelancer who worked on commission. A press release for the company referred to him as its New York regional director.

Early political forays

In 2018, using the name Anthony Devolder, Santos knocked on the door of Republican Vickie Paladino, who was then running for State Senate and was later elected to the New York City Council. He asked about volunteering for her campaign, pushing for a no-kill shelter for animals to be built in College Point, and saying he worked on Wall Street and could get large donors there to contribute. After he took a few campaign signs, Paladino's staff heard little further from him. The next year a bid to get Santos elected to the Queens County Republican Committee failed to get enough signatures to qualify him for the ballot.

Santos was part of a small group of New Yorkers called United for Trump who attempted to organize an August 2019 rally for Trump in Buffalo; he had already helped organize a counter-demonstration to a pro-impeachment rally there the previous month that led to violent clashes between the two groups. The effort failed when the other members questioned the $20,000 Santos said it was necessary to raise, including fees for speakers (which the counter-demonstration's local organizer had said were unnecessary), an accountant, and a lawyer to set up a limited liability company, when normally the largest expense in organizing such an event is the permit, which usually costs less than $100. Ultimately they raised only $645; it is not known what happened to that money.

Harbor City Capital

In mid-January 2020, shortly after Santos launched his first campaign for Congress in November 2019, he began working for Harbor City Capital, a Florida-based alternative investment firm. The Securities and Exchange Commission filed a civil suit a year and a half later accusing the company of running a $17million Ponzi scheme. In June, during his first run for Congress, Santos (under the name George Devolder) opened an office for Harbor City Capital at 1345 Avenue of the Americas in Midtown Manhattan; the next month he became the firm's New York regional director. He was not personally named in the lawsuit, nor were other colleagues of his, and has publicly denied any knowledge of the fraud. Santos claimed in a 2020 interview to be managing $1.5billion in funds for Harbor City, with a fixed yield income return of 12 percent and an internal rate of return of 26 percent.

At the time Santos took the regional director position, Harbor City had been banned from doing business in Alabama by that state's Securities Commission in response to complaints from residents. The commission alleged that the firm was "out to deceive Alabamians and profit off unsuspecting investors by using dazzling marketing tactics to sell unregistered bonds." An attorney for some of the defrauded customers has said that there were aspects of Harbor City's business that would have deterred a reputable financial professional from working there. "Even if you didn't know the company was operating as a fraud or a Ponzi scheme, a sophisticated person affiliated with the company should have known they weren't licensed to do what they claimed to be doing."

In April 2020, Santos made a since-deleted tweet from his personal account, under the name George Devolder, saying Harbor City offered investors stability in markets then roiled by the early stages of the COVID-19 pandemic, with "a strategy that mitigates loss and risk while creating cash flow, meanwhile your principle is 100% secured by an SBLC held by various major institutions." Two months later, an investor replied, saying that after they had received the SBLC (standby letter of credit) Santos referred to, Deutsche Bank told them it "was a complete fraud and not signed by the bank officer on the document". In response, Santos said, "I'm sorry I'm not following you" and asked the investor to email him for further discussion, reassuring them that the SBLC was "100% legitimate and issued by their institution". The bank later told CNN that Harbor City had never been a client, and the SEC said the company had never received any SBLC.

Bogosian and a client who had recently won a large damage award say Santos promised them at a dinner meeting in mid-November 2020 that he and Harbor City could grow their investment tenfold. In internal company meetings, Santos said that he often told prospective investors that he had once accidentally knocked a chair over on Blackstone Inc. chief executive Stephen A. Schwarzman during a meeting in the latter's office, and that he was friends with Marcie Frost, head of CalPERS, California's public-pension fund manager. Both said later they had no recollection of ever meeting Santos under either his own name or as George Devolder.

Columbus Nova CEO Andrew Intrater said he had invested $625,000 with Harbor City on the promise of a 16 percent annual return and his confidence in Santos, who told him he had not only raised $100million for the fund but invested $4million of family money in it, as his account manager. When the SEC sued in May 2021, Santos assured Intrater that a letter of credit covered his investment and that he would send a copy over, but he never did; according to Intrater, Santos was still making these claims as late as January 2022 and saying he would try to get Intrater's money back. The SEC said in its court filings that there never was a letter of credit and Santos's claims to Intrater were false; Harbor City had in fact raised only $17million, very little of which was actually invested. After receiving an initial interest payment in March 2021, Intrater has said, the next month's payment was clawed back for some reason.

Harbor City paid Santos at least through April 2021, after which he founded the Devolder Organization, which he has claimed as the basis of his wealth. Intrater has said Santos told him he had been let go from Harbor City before that due to conflicts with his political activities. But the company's founder has said that Santos was "definitely one of the ones that got the notice that everything we had had been frozen". Another investor Santos had pitched Harbor City to said Santos called him after the SEC suit was filed, crying that he had lost a million dollars of his own as a result.

Bogosian and her client told the Post shortly afterward that the SEC had subsequently called them asking for more information on what Santos told them about Harbor City at that dinner and afterward.

Devolder Organization 
Santos has given inconsistent explanations of what the Devolder Organization did. According to his financial disclosures, he was the sole owner and managing member of the Devolder Organization, which he said was a family-owned company that managed $80million in assets. On financial disclosure forms, Santos called Devolder a "capital introduction consulting" firm. Although based in New York, the company was registered in Florida, where it was dissolved in September 2022 for failing to file annual reports, which Santos said was because its accountant missed the annual filing deadline. During his 2022 congressional campaign, Santos lent his campaign more than $700,000, and reported receiving a salary of $750,000 and dividends of between $1million and $5million from Devolder, even though he also listed the company's estimated value as in the same range.

Despite the claims about the company's size, Santos's financial disclosure forms did not list any clients using the company's services; three experts in election law interviewed by the Times said that this omission "could be problematic if such clients exist". In July 2022, Dun & Bradstreet estimated Devolder's revenue at less than $50,000. On December 20, 2022, the day after the Times article was published, Santos re-registered the Devolder Organization in Florida. Josh Marshall reported on Talking Points Memo (TPM) that Santos listed himself as the registered agent on the paperwork, which could only be done if he lived in Florida and not New York. He gave as the company's mailing address a Merritt Island apartment purchased by a couple in August, an address also used by Harbor City's chief technology officer.

U.S. House of Representatives

2020 campaign 

Normally, the Nassau County Republican Committee, known for the tight control its leadership exercises over often competitive races for its nominations, would have discouraged an unknown candidate with such minimal experience. But the pandemic depressed interest in the race, and Suozzi was expected to win handily in any event. No other candidates put their names forward, leaving Santos as the nominee that year. Queens Republicans, still angry over his abortive challenge to them the year before, were unsupportive. Santos raised funds, spoke to donor groups, and attended a phone-banking session at Mar-a-Lago with Donald Trump's children; his efforts impressed party officials. He bought entire tables at New York Young Republican events. Other candidates making the same rounds noticed that Santos repeatedly exaggerated his fundraising totals, with a wide contrast between what he said and what he reported in his campaign finance disclosure forms.

Suozzi later recalled that he had no doubt he would defeat Santos, an unknown who was not well-funded and who at the time was registered to vote in an area of Queens then outside the district. When reporters pressed him about living outside the district, Santos claimed an address that turned out to be his campaign treasurer's. Suozzi recalled that during their few joint campaign appearances, Santos "came across as a phony" and that because Santos was so little-known in the district, the Suozzi campaign decided not to pay for opposition research, deciding that it would be counterproductive to increase his name recognition by drawing attention to him, even negatively. Suozzi won, as expected, 55.9 percent to 43.4 percent, a margin of about 46,000 votes. Despite the loss, local Republicans were pleasantly surprised by Santos's performance.

Refusal to accept election results
Santos refused to accept his 2020 defeat, and, like Trump, falsely claimed that the vote totals had been somehow manipulated. He began raising money and hiring additional staff for a recount, insisting that half the Democratic ballots should have been discarded, and refused to leave the orientation session for new members of Congress even after Suozzi's victory was certified. Mondaire Jones, a New York Democrat elected to the House that year, recalled Santos asking the most questions of anyone at the session, which amused him and others since "we [were] all like, dude, you're not even gonna be part of this Congress".

Santos spoke at a "Stop the Steal" rally the day before the January 6, 2021, attack on the Capitol, claiming to the crowd that he, too, had had an office stolen from him by fraud. On January 6, 2021, Santos attended Trump's similar rally at the Ellipse in Washington, D.C.; he later said that Trump "was energized", gave "a great speech", and was "at his full awesomeness" that day. After the speech, a mob of Trump supporters attacked the Capitol, disrupting the counting of the electoral votes that formalized Trump's loss in the 2020 United States presidential election. Santos later said he was "never on Capitol grounds" on January 6, called it a "sad and dark day", and acknowledged that Joe Biden fairly won the 2020 election. He was later captured on video saying that he had written a "nice check to a law firm" to bail January 6 arrestees out of jail, saying: "Don't want to publicize it, but pretty adamant about that. Imagine breaking into your own house and being charged for trespassing."

2022 campaign 

Shortly after his loss to Suozzi, Santos formed GADS PAC, a Leadership PAC, and began raising money to run again. Former New York state Republican chair Nick Langworthy (who was elected to Congress in 2022, along with Santos) said that "George never stopped being a candidate" and "was spending time at Mar-a-Lago, raising money in different circles". Throughout 2021, Santos continued to raise money and secure support.

New York Representative Elise Stefanik was an early supporter, and one of her aides was already helping Santos build a campaign. She endorsed him in August 2021, and nine months later tweeted that she had helped him raise over $100,000 at a lunch fundraiser. Some donors who contributed to Santos's campaign as a result of Stefanik's endorsement now feel she let them down, and believe she and some of her staff had to be aware of the rumors about his deceptions and background that had been circulating among New York Republicans at the time.

By January 2021, Santos had raised more than $5,000, triggering a requirement that he file a personal financial disclosure form listing all assets and liabilities. He did not do so at the time. Some Republicans began to have reservations about Santos. In mid-2021, one of his former advisors found out about his connections to Harbor City and some of its business practices; he was unsuccessful in getting a newspaper to cover it. After learning that Santos falsely claimed to have been endorsed by Trump, a major New York Republican donor who could not verify his claimed work history shared her suspicions with friends close to Stefanik. Saying they were "tired of being duped", the group asked Santos for his résumé; he refused, telling them the request was "invasive".

With Santos's permission, his campaign commissioned a vulnerability study on him late in the year. Some of his campaign staff were so taken aback by what the study found (including much that subsequently became publicly known) that they advised him to drop out of the race. He refused, disputing some of the study's findings and saying he would show them his diplomas. He never did, and after he told them he did not believe the information was as damaging as they did, the campaign staffers resigned.

Before the 2022 contest, Dan Conston, the leader of the Congressional Leadership Fund, the prime superPAC that closely supported Kevin McCarthy, also shared the study's findings with congressional leaders and prominent campaign donors, concerned that Santos's deceptions would become public, exposing him as an impostor. Through Stefanik, Santos was able to hire new staffers. He required those departed staffers to sign nondisclosure agreements, but they may still have talked to campaign vendors.

Republican officials had privately discussed the dubiousness of Santos's claimed past employment and personal wealth, but assumed he would have been vetted in 2020. Some Republicans tried to recruit state senator Jack Martins. After another candidate talked about running, Santos and his PACs donated $185,000 to the county Republican committee, which soon endorsed him. Jesse Garcia, chair of the Republican committee in neighboring Suffolk County, which at the time the 3rd district extended into, later said that, to help Santos avoid a primary, he persuaded that other candidate to run for the State Assembly instead. Republicans assumed that Santos would be running against Suozzi again, and Nassau County Republicans thus concentrated their efforts on state and local office.

After Suozzi announced in November 2021 that he would not seek reelection to Congress and instead would challenge Kathy Hochul for the Democratic gubernatorial nomination, the seat was left open, improving Republicans' chances. The next year, during redistricting, a new congressional district map drawn by the Democratic majority in the state legislature that would have made the 3rd district more Democratic was thrown out and replaced with a court-ordered district that added more Republican territory to it.

In June 2022, Santos received $46,000 in contributions over two weeks from executives at various cryptocurrency firms. These coincided with an industry lobbyist, Michelle Bond, entering the Republican primary for the neighboring 1st district, where Nick LaLota had already received the Suffolk County Republican Party's endorsement, heavily funded by many of those same donors. Santos's GADS PAC gave her campaign the maximum allowed, as did his sister Tiffany, and Bond's campaign paid $150,000 to Patriot Consultants, a firm owned by a couple who had also strongly supported Santos; their daughter is his press secretary. Santos never endorsed Bond, but was often seen with her at events. It is unusual for endorsed candidates to so openly support candidates challenging the party's endorsed candidate in another primary; Garcia, the Suffolk Republican chair who had helped Santos avoid a primary, said Santos supported Bond's candidacy "for the sole purpose of advancing his personal career at the expense of other members on the ticket". LaLota, who won the primary with 47% of the vote, called Santos's support for Bond "more than annoying" but decided not to make an issue of it.

Unopposed for the Republican nomination himself, Santos ran for the open seat against Democratic nominee Robert Zimmerman, who had run for the then-similar 4th district seat 40 years earlier, securing the 2022 nomination in late August in a six-way primary. His campaign had access to a 78-page opposition research file on Santos the Democratic Congressional Campaign Committee (DCCC) had compiled, which, in addition to statements of political positions anathema to Democratic voters, found some of the problems with Santos's record, such as his evictions and judgments, the pet-rescue charity unknown to the IRS, and his reticence about the Devolder Organization. Some of these were flagged as needing further research, such as whether Santos had a criminal record. Since that further research would cost thousands of dollars, Zimmerman decided that in the limited time he had until the election his campaign would instead focus its spending on voter outreach and advertising.

Media coverage focused on the race being the first instance of two openly gay candidates competing against one another in a general election for Congress. As they attacked each other for the alleged extremism of their political positions, Zimmerman warned that Santos "might actually be able to win just by avoiding discussing his own record". Democrats took Santos seriously enough that Jill Biden campaigned for Zimmerman. His campaign tried in vain to interest the media, at both the national and local levels, to look more closely at Santos. "We knew a lot about him did not add up; we were very conscious of that", Zimmerman said later. "But we didn't have the resources as a campaign to do the kind of digging that had to be done."

One local outlet, The North Shore Leader, a weekly newspaper serving the affluent suburban area of that name that has historically been the core of the district, did report on the questions raised by Santos's personal financial disclosure forms when he finally filed them in September 2022, as well as some other dubious claims of his personal wealth. No other media outlet reported on the matter until after the election. In October 2022, the Leader, whose publisher, Grant Lally, a longtime Republican activist who had himself previously been the party's nominee for the 3rd district, wrote that it "would like to endorse a Republican" in the race, but Santos "is so bizarre, unprincipled and sketchy that we cannot... he’s most likely just a fabulista fake". The Leader endorsed Zimmerman.

Campaign workers later described the organization as "sloppy" and the workplace as "toxic". Santos preferred hiring younger, less experienced workers who would be less likely to second-guess him. A former staffer described Santos as "very high-maintenance" and demanding, and said there was a feeling of paranoia throughout the campaign. Though he drove Santos to the office daily, the former staffer recalled being confused that Santos boasted of owning property in Nantucket while being picked up from a small apartment in Queens. Another employee recalled that her phone calls and emails were not answered for several days after she sent them.

Late in the campaign, both parties realized the elections on Long Island would be close and could decide control of the House. A Democratic political action committee spent $3million in the 3rd district race to support Zimmerman. On the Republican side, the Congressional Leadership Fund (CLF) spent nothing, while at the same time committing $1.5million to the neighboring 2nd and 4th district races, also ultimately won by Republicans. Sources told the Times that the CLF's leadership had been made aware of the problems with Santos.

Santos defeated Zimmerman in the November 2022 election by around eight percentage points, flipping the district (in what observers saw as a "mild upset") and helping Republicans retake control of the House by a narrow margin.

Speculation about effect awareness of misrepresentations could have had

In the wake of the disclosures about Santos after the election, Democratic Party officials and journalists asked whether Santos would have been elected had voters known about his misrepresentations. FiveThirtyEight noted that Santos's margin of victory was lower than Republicans running statewide who had carried the district—7.5 percent compared to Zeldin's 12 percent, for instance; Republican U.S. Senate candidate Joe Pinion carried the district by a 4 percent margin despite being vastly outspent by his victorious opponent, incumbent Senate majority leader Charles Schumer. The site's calculations suggest that scandals usually reduce an incumbent congressional candidate's margins by 9 percent, but there are so many other variables in elections that it cannot be assumed Santos would have lost just on that basis; sometimes candidates have actually done better than expected after a scandal, and scandal may have less effect in a time of hyperpartisan political identification.

Newsday found that Santos had also benefited from higher-than-usual Republican turnout on Long Island resulting from Zeldin's gubernatorial bid (Zeldin received 47 percent of the vote, the best performance in the state by a Republican candidate for governor since George Pataki in 2002), with 64 percent of the party's voters, 12 percent more than usual, showing up at the polls. "This was not about George Santos", Nassau County Republican chairman Joe Cairo told the paper, noting that Republican candidates, flipped seats in the state legislature in both Nassau and Suffolk counties as well as the congressional seats. "This was a Republican year. Any Republican would have won that district."

Had the state legislature's original redistricting plan been in place at the time of the election, Newsday found, it was likely that the Democratic candidate would have won the 3rd district. That plan, ruled unconstitutional by the state's Court of Appeals, its highest, would have combined the core of the old district on the North Shore and in neighboring Queens with heavily Democratic portions of Westchester County along the north coast of Long Island Sound. That potential district had voted for Biden in 2020 by a 57 percent margin, while the eventual 3rd district had done so by 54 percent, one percent less than the 2020 3rd district. Yet Democrats actually gained about 7,000 voters registered to them from the redistricting.

Cairo discounted the effect of the redistricting. His Democratic counterpart, Jay Jacobs (also the state party chair), agreed. Adding Massapequa to the district at the expense of Huntington had cost "maybe a couple of thousand votes" out of the 20,000 Santos won by. "What did this was the overriding message problem we had on crime and bail reform, the fever pitch those were at in the New York suburbs", Jacobs said. "Santos didn't get elected based on his outstanding resume and he didn't get elected because of redistricting. He got elected because the political environment in New York State favored the Republican messaging."

Post-2022 campaign
Santos was one of several incoming House Republicans to attend a Manhattan gala organized by the New York Young Republican Club that featured Republican politicians alongside white nationalists, conspiracy theorists, and other extreme right-wing figures. He was featured as a "special guest" at the event. The gala also featured Representative Marjorie Taylor Greene, Republican representatives-elect Cory Mills and Mike Collins, far-right commentator and conspiracy theorist Jack Posobiec, white supremacy activist Peter Brimelow, Newsweek opinion editor Josh Hammer, and members of the Freedom Party of Austria and Alternative for Germany, two right-wing European parties with an authoritarian heritage. Three weeks later, during the votes for Speaker of the House, Santos was photographed flashing the white supremacist "OK" sign.

In early December 2022, Santos told two Brazilian journalists on a podcast that he planned to donate his congressional salary, dividing it among four non-governmental organizations he declined to name, claiming that he was independently wealthy and did not need a salary. He refused to clarify the source of his claimed wealth.

In an email in late December 2022, Santos offered a bus trip to Washington that included an opportunity to attend his swearing-in ceremony and a campaign-led tour of the "Capitol grounds" for a donation ranging from $100 to $500; charging for tours of the U.S. Capitol is a violation of Congressional ethics rules.

2024 campaign 

Having refused to resign over his many misrepresentations, Santos has not yet announced whether he will run in 2024. Since he had reported raising more than $5,000 in campaign contributions since his election as of the end of January 2023, the Federal Election Commission (FEC) gave him until mid-March to declare his candidacy in the next election. On March 14, he filed a formal statement of candidacy with the commission, which does not mean that he will seek reelection, but only that he currently plans to.

New York Republicans, many of whom have distanced themselves from Santos, have expressed concern about the effect his candidacy might have on the reelection chances of other Republicans in the state, six of whom represent districts Democratic President Joe Biden carried in 2020. They have been reaching out to potential primary challengers, while hoping that the mounting allegations against him lead him to resign before then, especially if they lead to criminal charges. "George Santos will not be on any ticket in 2024", said Representative Marc Molinaro, who has announced he will vote for any resolution to expel Santos from the House. "I am confident that George Santos will not be on any ticket come 2024", said Representative Anthony D'Esposito, who represents the neighboring 4th district.

Republicans are in a difficult position, according to former Long Island congressman Peter King.

At the end of February 2023, the Democratic Congressional Campaign Committee announced a billboard campaign aimed at asking why five Republican representatives in New York who took money from Santos, including Molinaro and D'Esposito, have returned the contributions since Santos's misrepresentations became known.

Molinaro complained the Democrats are using Santos as "a bludgeoning tool without regard for truth" against Republicans. Both he and D'Esposito said that Santos has been a distraction from doing the jobs they were elected to do; LaLota says he hears from constituents regularly asking why Santos is still in Congress. "The reality is simple", Santos responded. "I was never a part of the little boys' club, and they hated me from the moment I got the nomination to the moment I got elected."

Tenure 

On January 3, 2023, a series of unsuccessful ballots in the 2023 Speaker of the United States House of Representatives election meant that Santos and other representatives-elect could not be sworn in. Santos voted for Kevin McCarthy for Speaker on all 15 ballots. Other New York House Republicans kept their distance from him on the House floor. D'Esposito, who had previously appeared with Santos in interviews, did not greet him. Santos was not included in a photo of the Republican members from southern New York with McCarthy that was posted on Twitter.

In the first weeks of the 118th Congress, Santos and 41 other Republicans cosponsored a resolution introduced by Pat Fallon to impeach Secretary of Homeland Security Alejandro Mayorkas.

On January 11, four Republican New York congressmen who had also been elected in 2022—D'Esposito, Nick LaLota, Nick Langworthy, and Brandon Williams—called for Santos to resign. The other two freshman Republican members of Congress from New York followed suit. All six were elected from competitive districts. Joseph Cairo, the chair of the Nassau County Republican Party, also called for Santos to resign, saying that he had "disgraced the House of Representatives, and we do not consider him one of our congresspeople". Representative Brian Fitzpatrick said that he did not believe Santos should be in the House and called for an "expedited review" of Santos's behavior. Langworthy, former state Republican chair, and Gerard Kassar, Conservative chair, on whose parties' lines Santos had run, called for him to resign. Nassau County executive Bruce Blakeman said he would refer all resident calls that were likely to require congressional constituent service to D'Esposito's office regardless of where in the county those residents live. "My office will have no interaction with George Santos or his staff until he resigns", he said.

Santos refused to resign, and has kept the support of Republican House leadership, including House Speaker Kevin McCarthy, House Majority Leader Steve Scalise, and congresswoman Elise Stefanik (the fourth-highest-ranking House Republican), who rely in part on Santos's vote to support their very narrow Republican majority in the House. McCarthy did not deny Santos committee assignments or impose any penalty on him for the misrepresentations he made during his campaign. Santos was assigned to the committees on small business and science, space, and technology. On January 31, 2023, he announced at a meeting of House Republicans that he was vacating his committee memberships, but said the move was temporary.

At the 2023 State of the Union Address, Senator Mitt Romney saw Santos near the aisle where senators and President Joe Biden entered the House floor. Romney told Santos "you don't belong here" as he passed. "Tell that to the 142,000 who voted for me", Santos responded, and then the two called each other assholes. The exchange went viral online after it was captured on video. Romney later told reporters that, because Santos, whom he called "a sick little puppy", was under ethics investigation at the time, he should have retreated to the back row instead of "parading in front of the room".

On February 9, a group of House Democrats led by Robert Garcia filed a resolution to expel Santos from Congress; it would require the support of two-thirds of members to pass. Also in February 2023, Santos joined Representatives Lauren Boebert, Barry Moore, and Andrew Clyde to sponsor a bill to name the AR-15 the "national gun".

At the beginning of March, Santos introduced his first bill, the SALT Relief Act. It would raise the $10,000 cap on the state and local tax deduction (SALT) imposed during Trump's first year in office for single filers to $50,000. "[This] will provide real tax relief not just to New York's Third Congressional District but to all," Santos said in a statement accompanying the bill. SALT increases have been more popular among Democrats from suburban districts like Santos's than among Republicans, since many residents there pay high local property taxes. D'Esposito and LaLota, who represent neighboring districts, said that while they were interested in getting similar relief for their constituents, they would not work with Santos to do so.

Committee assignments
Withdrew on January 31, 2023
 Committee on Small Business
 Committee on Space, Science, and Technology

Political positions 
Santos has aligned himself with former president Donald Trump. At a March 2019 event held by the conservative #WalkAway Foundation that encouraged members of the LGBTQ community to leave the Democratic Party, Santos (introducing himself as Anthony Devolder) claimed to have formed a group called United for Trump and asked Blaire White, a transgender YouTuber, how she "can help educate other trans people from not having to follow the narrative that the media and the Democrats put forward".

In August 2021, Santos called President Joe Biden a "pathological liar".

Santos has called police brutality a "made-up concept". In a 2022 speech to the Whitestone Republican Club in Whitestone, Queens, Santos called abortion "barbaric" and compared it to slavery.

Interviewed by Representative Matt Gaetz on Steve Bannon's podcast, Santos repeated his earlier denials of wrongdoing beyond what he had already admitted and did not answer questions about where the $700,000 had come from.

False biographical statements scandal 
In September 2022, The North Shore Leader raised questions about Santos's net worth increase from "barely above 'zero'" to $11million between 2020 and 2022. No other media outlet followed the Leader in publishing investigatory articles on Santos before the 2022 election.

On December 19, after Santos won the election but before he was to take office in January 2023, The New York Times reported that he had apparently misrepresented many aspects of his life and career, including his education and employment history. The Times also reported Santos had unresolved charges for check fraud in Brazil. The same day, Santos's lawyer wrote that Times was "attempting to smear [Santos's] good name with these defamatory allegations"; Santos did not produce any documents to substantiate his claims, despite several requests. On December 21, The Forward and Jewish Insider reported that Santos had lied extensively about his family's supposed Jewish heritage. His initial claims that his maternal grandparents were Jewish Holocaust refugees who fled Soviet Ukraine and German-occupied Belgium were false; both his maternal grandparents were born in Brazil. On December 22, Santos wrote on Twitter: "I have my story to tell and it will be told next week"; the same day, New York Attorney General Letitia James announced an investigation had been opened into Santos.

On December 26, Santos broke his silence with interviews on WABC radio and in The New York Post. He denied being a criminal to WABC radio, saying, "I'm not a fraud. I'm not a criminal who defrauded the entire country and made up this fictional character and ran for Congress." Santos admitted to the Post that he lied about graduating from college and working for Goldman Sachs and CitiGroup. During the interview, he said: "I never claimed to be Jewish. I am Catholic. Because I learned my maternal family had a Jewish background, I said I was 'Jew-ish.'" He also acknowledged his former marriage, but described himself as "very much gay".

The Republican Jewish Coalition, which had previously hosted Santos at their events, announced on December 27 that he would no longer be welcome at them. According to the organization's CEO, Matt Brooks, Santos "deceived us and misrepresented his heritage. In public comments and to us personally he previously claimed to be Jewish"; during Santos's 2022 campaign appearances, he called himself an "American Jew" and a "Latino Jew" on repeated occasions. The same day, Santos was interviewed by Tulsi Gabbard on Fox News, his first television appearance since the controversy broke. Gabbard asked him about the meaning of "integrity"; Santos said he showed "courage" by admitting his "mistakes" on national television. Gabbard then asked him, "Do you have no shame?", to which Santos responded that he "can say the same thing about the Democrats"; Gabbard then told him that her question was not about Democrats. Asked about his purported Jewish heritage, Santos responded: "My heritage is Jewish. I've always identified as Jewish. I was raised as a practicing Catholic... I understand everybody wants to nitpick at me". Asked about his lies about working for Citigroup and Goldman Sachs, he said that whether they were lies was "debatable" and that the nature of his work would require a "discussion that can go way above the American people's head", a characterization Gabbard called insulting. By the next day, federal prosecutors for the Eastern District of New York were investigating Santos's finances, and the Nassau County district attorney was investigating him for unspecified reasons.

Throughout December, Republican leaders were largely silent on the scandal, with House Republican leader Kevin McCarthy declining to comment. The New York Post reported that a senior House Republican aide had told them House Republican leaders were aware of the false biographical claims before the election, saying the topic had become a "running joke". Some former Republican supporters called upon Santos to explain himself, including former Long Island Republican representative Peter T. King. Then Representative-elect Nick LaLota, who had resented Santos's support for his primary challenger Michelle Bond, called for the House Ethics Committee to investigate Santos. Nassau County Republican chairman Joseph G. Cairo said he was "deeply disappointed" in Santos, saying, "I expected more than a blanket apology" after Santos publicly addressed the issue for the first time. "The damage that his lies have caused to many people, especially those who have been impacted by the Holocaust, are profound," but did not call for Santos to resign or be investigated. Representative Marjorie Taylor Greene, who had befriended Santos during 2020 new member orientation, defended him, while retiring Representative Kevin Brady said Santos "certainly is going to have to consider resigning".

In February 2023, TPM reported on a conversation with Santos recorded by Derek Myers, an Ohio journalist facing criminal charges over having published a transcript of an exchange recorded in a closed courtroom. Myers had been working for Santos for a week on a trial basis; the conversation marked the end of that relationship. "I've made bad judgment calls, and I'm reaping the consequences of those bad judgment calls ... I've obviously fucked up and lied to him, like I lied to everyone else", Santos said at one point, apparently referencing his chief of staff Charles Lovett. The conversation also indicates that Lovett signed a three-year nondisclosure agreement (NDA), because "George knows that Charlie knows things about George", according to Myers. Lovett said that was a joke between him and Santos and no one on Santos's staff has had to sign an NDA.

False claims about family, religion, and education 
Santos has used the name Anthony Zabrovsky to fundraise for a pet charity ("Ironbound Animal Rescue"), while records contradict his claim that his maternal grandparents had any Ukrainian Jewish ancestry, or any ancestral last name of Zabrovsky. Santos has also claimed that he is biracial, as his father was born in Angola, but there is no evidence of that.

"I believe we are all Jewish, at the end, because Jesus Christ is Jewish", Santos said on a Queens public-access cable show about conservative politics he co-hosted during his 2020 campaign. He said that he himself was Catholic and disclaimed any interpretation that he was asserting Jewish heritage, but also pointed to his maternal grandfather, Paulo Horta Devolder, who he claimed was raised a Jew in Soviet Ukraine and converted to Catholicism during the 1930s. He did not otherwise make much mention of his purported Jewish ancestry during his 2020 run, but he referred to it frequently in 2022, when all the candidates seeking the Democratic nomination to replace Suozzi were Jewish. At a U.S.–Israel Political Action Committee event outside Miami a month before the election, he called himself "halakhically Jewish". A co-chair of the organization said that gave those present the impression that Santos's mother was Jewish, "[getting] a chuckle out of the crowd"; the PAC gave his campaign $5,000 that day.

According to a former friend, Santos frequently made antisemitic jokes, then claimed this was acceptable because he was Jewish. The same person also corroborated an account that Santos had joked on Facebook about Adolf Hitler killing Jews and Black people.

In a February 2023 appearance on Piers Morgan Uncensored, Santos asserted his claimed ancestry would be vindicated. "This is the one that I'll battle to my grave, to the point that I've already ordered those DNA test kits and I've gotten four of them so far, and I'm just waiting for their returns", he said.

Claims about mother

On his campaign website, Santos wrote that his mother was "the first female executive at a major financial institution" and that she worked in the South Tower of the World Trade Center and died "a few years later" after surviving the September 11, 2001 attacks. On his mother's 2003 visa application to return to the U.S. from Brazil, however, she stated that she had not been in the U.S. since 1999. His mother's actual occupation has been described as domestic worker or home care nurse; she described herself that way on her 2003 visa application.

Upon her death, a Brazilian community newspaper described her as a cook. Santos's former roommates and friends said she spoke no English. In July 2021, Santos wrote on Twitter that "9/11 claimed my  life"; in an October 2021 interview, he said his mother was "caught up in the ash cloud" during 9/11 but "never applied for relief" because the family could afford the medical bills; in December 2021, he wrote on Twitter that his mother had died five years earlier; in December 2022, he claimed that both of his parents survived being "down there" at the World Trade Center during 9/11. A priest at the family's Catholic church reported that Santos had told him the family could not afford a funeral when Santos's mother died in 2016. The priest recalled that a collection at a memorial Mass raised a "significant" amount for the family, which he gave to Santos; he also had a friend set up a GoFundMe.

In his Piers Morgan interview, Santos insisted his mother had been at the World Trade Center the day of the attack. "It's quite insensitive to try to rehash my mother's legacy", he said. "She wasn't one to mislead me ... I stay convinced that's the truth."

Educational claims 

Santos claimed in 2019 and 2020 to have attended the Horace Mann School, an elite preparatory school in the Bronx, before withdrawing because of family hardship. The school reports it has no record of Santos. Later he told Morgan he was in ninth grade there for six months, at age 14–15, suggesting he had attended under one of his other names; the school reiterated to CNN that they had "checked all the records and all the names, and he did not attend."

There is no known record of Santos ever having attended any college or university. Both colleges he claimed to attend have said they have no record of him. "I would have never gotten the nomination from the Nassau County GOP if I had not concluded college", Santos said in a February 2023 Newsmax interview. "To say that I deceived, and it was a campaign of deceit and deception is just not fair. That's just the political spin that the Nassau County GOP wants to create on this narrative."

Santos falsely claimed to hold a bachelor's degree in finance and economics from Baruch College and to have graduated in the top percentile of his class with a 3.89 grade point average; his claimed period of attendance overlapped with his time in Brazil. Friends of his have recalled times when he claimed to be taking classes at Baruch but never seemed to study. In January 2023, Nassau County Republican Party Chairman Joseph Cairo said during a press conference that Santos falsely told him that he was a "star player" on the Baruch volleyball team, as his LinkBridge supervisor had been, and that it had won the league championship. In a pre-election radio interview, Santos claimed that his supposed volleyball career led to him needing both knees replaced. He has admitted to lying about graduating from any college.

Santos also falsely claimed to hold a master of business administration from New York University (NYU), to have scored 710 on the Graduate Management Admission Test, (GMAT) and to have paid off his supposed student loans by 2020. A prospective Harbor City investor recalled that Santos told him he had turned down an offer to attend Harvard Business School. Gregory Morey-Parker, a roommate who lent Santos money in 2014 that has not been repaid despite a judgment to that effect, recalled Santos claiming to be a graduate of NYU's business school but seeming not to know the school's name; he also later recalled how Santos's personal financial situation fluctuated wildly: "[He] would go to bars with rolls of hundred dollar bills and, three days later, he would have no money."

In his interview with Morgan, Santos admitted that he lied about his college experience, calling it the "biggest regret of his life". He explained that he did so because of "expectation on society" to have that as part of his biography, but that he couldn't afford to actually attend. He disclaimed any responsibility for the GMAT score appearing in the résumé published by the Nassau County Republican committee, saying, "I didn't supply it and nobody associated with me supplied it. That came from the GOP, and I'm still trying to understand where that came from." Morgan asked why Santos thought he could get away with lying about his education in a congressional election, and Santos replied that since no one had raised any questions about those claims during his 2020 campaign, he believed they would not be an issue in a later campaign.

False claims related to employment 

Throughout his career, Santos has used various aliases, including "Anthony Zabrovsky" and "Anthony Devolder". A 2011 Wikipedia userpage created under the latter name claims the account holder acted in Hannah Montana and The Suite Life of Zack and Cody.

After returning from Brazil, Santos told friends that he had worked as a journalist for Brazilian media conglomerate Globo. The New York Times could not find his name on the organization's website. Santos also told a roommate in late 2013 that he was a model who had worked at New York Fashion Week and would be appearing in Vogue.

Santos called himself a "seasoned Wall Street financier and investor" and said he had worked for Citigroup and Goldman Sachs, but neither company has any record of him. His campaign website stated that he was "an associate asset manager in the real asset division" of Citigroup, but the company sold its asset management division in 2005, before his claimed employment.

On a 2022 podcast, Santos claimed that while employed at Goldman he attended the SALT Conference seven years earlier and criticized the company for investing in renewable energy, calling it a taxpayer-subsidized scam. Anthony Scaramucci, who runs the conference, said there is no record that Santos ever attended. Santos's recollections of working at Goldman fooled one Wall Street interlocutor in early 2022. Another was not deceived, recalling a March political fundraiser where Santos proposed a U.S. sovereign default as a diplomatic pressure tactic against China, which he said no one working in finance would suggest due to its potentially catastrophic consequences.

Santos worked as a customer service representative at a call center for Dish Network in College Point, Queens, from October 2011 to July 2012, overlapping the time he said he worked at Citigroup. He later told the Post that his Citigroup claim was "a poor choice of words" and that a subsequent employer had been in "limited partnerships" with those companies. Acquaintances and coworkers said that Santos claimed his family was wealthy and had extensive real estate holdings in the U.S. and Brazil. He repeated this claim during his 2022 congressional campaign, saying that he and his family owned 13 rental properties in New York. No such properties were listed on his campaign's financial disclosure forms or in public records. Santos later admitted to the Post that the claim was false and he owned no properties as of the end of 2022.

In a November 2022 interview, Santos discussed the Pulse nightclub shooting in Orlando that year, saying that his company "lost four employees" there. The New York Times found no connection between the 49 victims killed in the attack and any company named in Santos's biography. In a December 2022 interview, Santos changed his story, saying, "We did lose four people that were going to be coming to work for the company that I was starting up in Orlando".

During his 2022 congressional campaign, Santos told prospective donors that he was a producer for the musical Spider-Man: Turn Off the Dark. Michael Cohl, Spider-Man's lead producer, denied that Santos was involved with the show, and the musical's playbills did not contain his name. Santos was living in Brazil in 2011 when the show opened, and his alleged time as producer overlaps his employment at Dish.

Conflicting residential claims 

Santos has offered conflicting accounts of his residence. During his 2020 campaign, he listed his home as in Elmhurst, Queens, outside the boundaries of the district in which he was then seeking office. Santos and his partner later moved to a rowhouse in Whitestone, Queens; its owner said they had moved there in July 2020. In March 2022, Santos told Newsday that he had moved out of the Whitestone rowhouse because of the alleged January 2021 vandalism incident, but seven months later he said he still lived in the Whitestone home. He was registered to vote at the Whitestone address during his congressional campaigns, but did not appear to live there.

Santos's landlord said he actually had moved out of the Whitestone rowhouse in August 2022, leaving $17,000 in damages, but records showed he was still registered there when he voted that November. He continued to receive mail there after the election, including the certificate of his election victory, according to the landlord, who had disposed of most of it. Santos told reporters that he planned to move to Oyster Bay, but he and his partner apparently moved into a house in Huntington, outside his congressional district's boundaries, in August 2022. He told the Post the house was his sister's, but the Times later found she lived in Elmhurst.

Unverified claims to have been a crime victim

On at least three occasions Santos has claimed to have been the victim of a crime that he apparently never reported to the police. In January 2016, he claimed to have been robbed of the money he was on his way to give his former landlady's attorney in settlement of her eviction claim against him. Five years later, Santos claimed he and his partner had found stones and eggs thrown at their Whitestone apartment after they returned to it from a party at Mar-a-Lago. The owner, who lived in the building's lower unit, did not recall any such incident and the Times found no relevant police report.

After his election victory, Santos told two Brazilian journalists on a podcast that during summer 2021, he had again been mugged in New York City, this time as he walked out of a building at the corner of Fifth Avenue and 55th Street in midtown Manhattan in mid-afternoon. A group of thieves, he said, made off with his briefcase, watch and shoes and fled the scene before anyone, even the police, noticed anything. Vanity Fair noted that the intersection in question is one of the busiest in the city, crossed by roughly 27,000 pedestrians every three hours during the day. Additionally, The Peninsula New York luxury hotel is on one of the corners, with a Harry Winston jewelry store opposite, resulting in a heavy security presence which likely includes many security cameras. Santos has not provided a police report of the incident as the podcast hosts requested. His description of the alleged assault included a comment that has been characterized as an "overtly racist" stereotype about Black people being likely to commit crimes.

Unverified health claims 
In addition to his claim in October 2020 of having both knees replaced, Santos said in an interview earlier that year that he had been diagnosed with a brain tumor and received radiation treatment. He also claims to suffer from an immunodeficiency and acute chronic bronchitis. When asked in 2022, his campaign did not give details or answer questions about his purported brain tumor.

False claims of charitable work 

In his 2020 campaign online biography, Santos claimed he and his family had worked charitably on behalf of children born with the rare genetic skin disorder epidermolysis bullosa (EB). Vice found that no one involved with the few charities that specifically work with EB patients in the U.S. or Brazil had ever received contributions, or heard of him (under any name Santos is known to have used) or his family being involved with efforts in that area. Sometime during 2022, the campaign changed the website so it no longer mentioned EB to language saying his family's charitable efforts were directed at "helping at-risk children and America's veterans".

Campaign finance issues 
During his 2020 campaign, one consultant who met Santos called him "a walking campaign-finance violation". He frequently volunteered ideas for getting around restrictions. One was to have donors who had reached their limit give to other Republicans' PACs, which would then donate the money back to him.

Discrepancies in assets reported on financial disclosure forms
Santos filed personal financial disclosure forms the House requires of congressional candidates in early September, 20 months past the due date, when he had raised $5,000 in campaign funds. The Leader took note of the contrast between them and similar forms he had filed for the 2020 elections. In 2020, he had listed a net worth of $5,000 and claimed his only income was his $50,000 Harbor City salary. By 2022, he said he was worth between $2.5 and $11million, including $1–5million in personal bank accounts, a Rio condominium valued between $500,000 and $1million, and business interests accounting for the rest. He reported no real property in the U.S., at odds with past claims that he owned two mansions on Long Island, one of which, in the Hamptons, he had reportedly told fellow Republicans he was selling for around $10million because he rarely used it (the Leader reported that at the time, someone with no connection to Santos owned it, and it was valued at $2million).

A $600,000 loan Santos had reported making to his campaign earlier in the year on his required campaign financial disclosure forms was not listed as a liability on his personal forms, even as he had disclosed a $20,000–50,000 car loan he took out for the Nissan he drove. He claimed no income.

In a later interview, Santos said he was able to take advantage of a network of around 15,000 "wealthy investors, family offices, 'institutions' and endowments" after leaving Harbor City Capital and forming Devolder Organization LLC to get contracts worth several million dollars. "If you're looking at a $20million yacht, my referral fee there can be anywhere between $200,000 and $400,000", he said. He did not identify any of his clients when asked to do so.

In March 2023, it was reported that Santos had brokered the sale of a yacht the previous October, just before the election, between two of his major campaign contributors. He had negotiated the sale of the  Namaste, with cabins for 12 guests and seven crew plus a waterfall, infinity pool, and outdoor shower, for $19 million. The seller was a Florida lawyer whose wife had given over $10,000 to one of Santos's campaign committees, the buyer a Long Island car dealer who has given $17,000 to Santos's committees (the man's former wives also gave $10,000). It is not known how much Santos received as a commission on the deal. The transaction is not itself illegal, but the timing and participants could suggest an effort to circumvent campaign finance limits or condition his services on receipt of campaign contributions, both of which would be. Authorities are investigating.

Excessive campaign spending
During his campaign, Santos spent prodigiously; he used campaign funds to pay for shirts for staff from Brooks Brothers, meals at the restaurant at the Bergdorf Goodman department store, and $40,000 in airline fares, including to locations in California, Texas and Florida, and a stay at The Breakers in Palm Beach, Florida, part of $30,000 in hotel bills, $14,000 paid to car services, and an equivalent sum spent at a Queens restaurant. That much airfare, the Times later noted, is far more than most candidates spend on their first election and closer to the amounts spent by party leaders who have served in Congress for years. Two campaign aides told the Times that staff were increasingly concerned during the campaign that Santos was more interested in spending the $3million raised for the race "frivolously" than on winning the election.

Santos's campaign finance reports listed a company called "Cleaner 123" as receiving $11,000 over four months in rent for campaign staff housing in the district. Neighbors of the house said that Santos and his partner appeared to have been living there during that time.

Discrepancies in reported donations to other candidates

Santos's campaign and GADS PAC reported making a combined $180,000 in contributions to other Republican campaigns. A review by the Times of those other campaigns' financial reports found many instances where theirs and Santos's do not match.

The PAC reported making two $2,900 donations to Michelle Bond's unsuccessful primary campaign for the Republican nomination in the neighboring 1st district. Her campaign's reports show a single donation of $5,000, $800 less than Santos's PAC reported. The PAC's donations to Blake Masters's unsuccessful campaign for the U.S. Senate in Arizona are acknowledged by the recipient, but a subsequent $2,000 from Santos's campaign committee is not, and the Masters campaign says it can find no records of it. The address Santos's campaign gave for that contribution, like some of the donations Santos reported, was apparently fictitious, this one in the Florida Panhandle.

This pattern also extended to Republican candidates for state office. Disclosure reports for those campaigns on file with the New York State Board of Elections in Albany show over 20 donations to them from Santos's campaign and his PACs during the 2020–22 election cycle. There are no corresponding reports of those donations on Santos's and GADS PAC's FEC filings.

Politico later looked at Santos's 2020 campaign finance reports, and found similar discrepancies in both state and federal reports. Shortly after being formed in 2019, Santos's campaign committee made its first donations, $9,000 total, to Trump's presidential campaign committee and two local Republican organizations. The first, at $2,800, is not reported in the Trump campaign's filings and exceeds the cycle limit for contributions from one campaign to another. The second is to the "Town of Oyster Bay Republican Club", a nonexistent entity. The New York state records of two Republican organizations that do use the town's name show no contributions from Santos. Similarly, a $2,000 contribution to the Nassau County Republican Committee is not reflected on that organization's records. "It's impossible to believe that all three of these political committees independently lost track of political donations from Santos' campaign during this period", a campaign finance lawyer the website spoke to said.

Unitemized $199.99 expenses

In a later article, the Times noted that Santos's campaign spent more than $5,000 on flights to and hotel stays in Washington and West Palm Beach, Florida, for Republican fundraisers in the first quarter of 2021, a time when the next congressional election was almost two years away and he had no primary challenger. By the end of the year, Santos's reported expenses for those trips had reached $90,000 and had become more lavish, with hundreds of dollars spent on transportation, hotels and food around the country.

In early 2022, the campaign filed amended reports. Among the changes made were upward adjustments to some of the expenses he had reported at the end of 2021. A $60 meal at a Michigan sushi restaurant was now reported as having cost $199.99, along with three additional expenses of that exact amount on that date. Five previously reported Uber and taxi rides went from $267 total to $445. A subsequent amended report, in May, reported no transactions on the date to which the sushi dinner had previously been attributed.

Santos's campaign financial disclosures went on to include many other expenses of $199.99—one cent below the $200 threshold at which campaigns must provide receipts and disclose recipients. An election law expert the Times talked to suggested that this could indicate awareness of the law and intent to violate it. One of those expenses was for a Miami hotel where rooms rarely rent for under $600 a night. The Times later reported that other Miami businesses where the campaign reported spending money could not find receipts for those amounts or said the expenses did not reflect the prices of the products allegedly purchased.

Politico later compared Santos's campaign reports to other congressional campaigns that spent similar total amounts, and found that only 9 percent of them had recorded any expenses in the $199–200 range. Most of those were to the videoconferencing service Zoom, which offers a business plan for $199.90. Of 4,300 campaigns that filed reports during the cycle, only 25 reported any expenses of exactly $199.99; of those, the most times that amount was claimed was four, while Santos's campaign claimed it 37 times. Politico called this "a statistical improbability".

The Times noted that the $199.99 transactions reached a total of 1,200 separate payments in Santos's early 2022 amended report, totaling over $250,000. They were still in the amended report from May of that year, which had removed the larger sushi-dinner bill and taxi expenditures. By the end of the campaign, the total unitemized expenditures had exceeded $365,000, 12 percent of his total campaign expenses and six times that of any other member of Congress from New York. Since federal election regulations require that campaigns itemize all transactions with a particular vendor once the amount exceeds $200, the Times calculated that Santos's campaign would have to have done business with over 1,800 separate concerns for all the unitemized transactions to be lawfully reported as such. His campaign lists 270. An expert at the Campaign Legal Center (CLC) said the campaign's reporting was "so ludicrous that it's completely wrong" and suggested the campaign was covering up its actual expenses.

Santos suggested in a subsequent interview that the recurrences of "$199.99" could have been clerical errors that could be "rectified if there is any discrepancy."

Il Bacco restaurant

During his two congressional runs in 2020 and 2022, Santos reported having spent over $25,000 at Il Bacco, an eatery popular for New York City Republican events; he had also entertained prospective Harbor City clients there. Santos's 2022 campaign reports owing Il Bacco nearly $19,000 for its election night victory party, in addition to seven of the instances where the campaign had reported spending exactly $199.99.

Santos appointed Il Bacco's owner, Joe Oppedisano, along with his daughter, the restaurant's manager, to his campaign's "Small Business for Santos" Coalition; Oppedisano in turn donated $6,500 to his campaign and its associated PACs. Oppedisano's brother Rocco also gave Santos's campaign $500. Because Rocco is not a U.S. citizen and his permanent resident status was revoked after guns and drugs were seized from his properties in 2009, he cannot legally make campaign contributions.

Creation of and loans to PAC
In July 2021, Santos loaned GADS PAC $25,000, five times what it had on hand at the time; the next day, the PAC donated the same amount to the campaign of Lee Zeldin, a Republican congressman from Long Island who became the party's gubernatorial nominee in 2022. Starting in April 2022, GADS PAC, by then flush with donations from Santos supporters, repaid him in four installments over the next two months. Effectively, Santos had arranged for his campaign contributors to repay the loan.

Robert Maguire, an expert on the subject at Citizens for Responsibility and Ethics in Washington (CREW), found several aspects of the transaction "extremely strange", including Santos's loan to a PAC (rather than his campaign committee, as is more typical) and his establishment of a leadership PAC for himself before even being elected to Congress (such PACs are used by party leaders and committee chairs or ranking members, to support colleagues).

FEC investigations and complaints
During 2021-22, the Federal Election Commission (FEC) wrote over 20 letters to Santos's campaign about problems with its disclosure reports. Fourteen concerned either contributors who had apparently exceeded the $2,900 per cycle limit and insufficient information on the terms and any co-guarantors or collateral of loans to the campaign. Some original reports also unlawfully described contributions as coming from anonymous donors. The campaign responded with amended reports, ultimately filing 36 total reports for the 10 periods in which reports were required.

In December 2022, the FEC wrote to Nancy Marks, then Santos's campaign treasurer, about the same problems, as well as other potential violations, including contributions from apparent political organizations not registered with the commission and insufficient disclosures regarding other contributions, such as the 48-hour notice required for contributions of more than $1,000 during the last 20 days before the election, after the last required report has been filed. The campaign had until January 24, 2023, to correct those violations by filing an amended report listing all required information and any corrective actions taken, such as returning the excess funds or applying them to a different candidate or cycle. Santos' attorney denied that the Santos campaign "engaged in any unlawful spending of campaign funds".

Also in January 2023, the CLC filed a complaint with the FEC over the Santos campaign's apparent violations. The complaint alleged that Santos used campaign funds to pay personal expenses; concealed the source of $700,000 he had given his campaign; and falsified campaign expenditures. End Citizens United (ECU) filed separate complaints with the FEC, Department of Justice, and Office of Congressional Ethics. Accountable.US filed an additional FEC complaint by the end of the week, alleging over $100,000 in contributions over the limit.

On January 24, the campaign filed amended reports with the FEC addressing the concerns it raised. The amendments largely consisted of unchecking the boxes that said two loans to the campaign, including the $750,000, had come from Santos's personal funds and did not provide required explanations of who had lent the campaign the money. Other loans, in earlier reports that were amended, were still marked as having come from Santos. Campaign finance experts to whom the Times spoke said that was very unusual, as was the number of times the Santos campaign had to file amended reports. In a mid-February interview, Santos said the money had come from his own finances and "I continue to not understand why there is this enormous inquisition and inquiry into my business practices and the legitimacy of it."

On January 27, it was reported that the Justice Department has asked the FEC to suspend its probe while federal prosecutors conduct a parallel criminal investigation. Also on January 27, five members of the House requested that the Attorney General open an investigation into violations of campaign law and the Foreign Agent Registration Act. Four days later, the campaign filed year-end reports signed by a third treasurer, and including a resignation letter from Marks dated January 25, although her signature remained on some reports dated later. There was also no paperwork from the campaign confirming the new treasurer's hiring.

At the end of January, ECU filed another FEC complaint against the Santos campaign. It pointed to $260,000 it had raised after the 2020 election as a recount fund. New York allows for recounts at public expense when the margin is close, but Santos lost that election by a much wider margin, and the state does not allow candidates to request recounts even if they are willing to pay for them. The recount fund was thus unnecessary, but it reported paying several workers to observe the nonexistent recount. ECU also noted that several expenses appear to be duplicates of those the campaign reported before the election. Asked about amended campaign reports and the true source of the loan, Santos said that he "didn't touch any of my FEC stuff" and that "Every campaign hires fiduciaries."

In February, the FEC informed Santos that, as in 2021, according to its records his campaign had raised more than $5,000 without any outstanding debts, thereby making him a candidate in the 2024 elections. It gave him until March 14 to declare whether he will be a candidate then; on that day, Santos formally filed a statement with it that he would be.

Campaign treasurer issues

The campaign's amended reports from late January 2023 also listed a new campaign treasurer, who had worked in that capacity for Josh Mandel's 2022 campaign for the Ohio U.S. Senate seat later won by J. D. Vance until he was replaced for what the campaign told the FEC were "a stunning number of inexplicable reporting errors". Santos's chief of staff had also worked for Mandel's campaign. The claimed new treasurer said he had nothing to do with the Santos campaign beyond declining the job, and that someone else had signed his name to the filings. The FEC sent another letter to the Santos campaign asking for clarification of the issue.

In mid-February, the FEC gave Santos's campaign until March 14 to name a new treasurer or it would be suspended from raising or spending money until it did. A week later, the campaign reported it had hired a new treasurer, Andrew Olson, who gave the same Elmhurst address that Santos had when he ran for office, and where Tiffany Santos had lived until mid-January after she settled an eviction case with the landlord. Businesses on the building's ground floor told CNN they knew no person by that name working at that address. "I've never seen this before: Having a complete mystery as a treasurer for a sitting member of Congress", said CREW's Jordan Libowitz.

Olson has never worked for any other campaign and did not give a phone number on the form. Local Republican officials had never heard of him either. The form also incorrectly described the committee as a national committee of the Republican Party. Campaign finance lawyer Brett Kappel called that a "mind-boggling" mistake. "I was frankly shocked that someone would file that in this situation".

Alleged use of fictitious donors and donations

Mother Jones reporters found in late January 2023 that many contributions to Santos's 2020 campaign were from people whose names and addresses were fictitious or nonexistent, all reported as having given through WinRed, an online processor of small-donor contributions for Republicans. Some were from real people who denied having donated the amount claimed. These accounted for 12 donations totaling $30,000 of the $338,000 Santos reported raising from individual contributors. Nine of those donors were among the 45 listed as having given Santos the maximum allowed under law for both the primary and general cycles. The magazine later found that relatives of Santos in Queens who had been reported to have given his campaign over $45,000 denied having made those donations; one said he could not have afforded the amount.

As part of its investigation into the $365,000 in unitemized campaign expenditures, the Times found some Santos donors who said they were reported to have given more than the legal limit and more than their own records showed, sometimes in ways that suggested an attempt to make the contributions appear legal. One donor said the $20,000 the campaign reported he gave ($7,000 more than his records showed in contributions to Santos and related organizations) was in 24 separate transactions, all of which used his former address but different versions of his name, and incorrectly claimed he had a spouse.

Alleged credit card fraud and misuse of WinRed

TPM reported on a contributor to Santos's 2020 campaign who had, after repeated contacts and an assurance from Zeldin's campaign staff that Santos was a credible candidate, given $1,000 by credit card, over the phone. They decided not to contribute to Santos after that, but found their credit card bill recording additional donations to Santos through WinRed during 2021 and 2022, almost $15,000 total, some of which exceeded cycle limits. WinRed, which has been accused of signing donors up for recurring contributions they never agreed to, was unable to find any record of those transactions and eventually refunded $2,000 to them, which the Santos campaign FEC filings do report. The donor, who does not believe the charges were accidental since they were for different amounts, was ultimately given a full refund by American Express.

In August and September 2021 the donor told TPM that their card had also been used to make two unauthorized contributions of the $2,900 maximum to Tina Forte, the Republican challenger to Representative Alexandria Ocasio-Cortez in the district neighboring Santos's, whom they had never heard of. They were not the only donor to experience this. One woman who gave Forte $25 through WinRed found the next day that her card had been charged $5,800, an amount more than 10 times any donation she had ever made through the site; she received a full refund the next day.

NBC News found another discrepancy related to the campaign's use of WinRed. The platform charges a standard 3.94 percent fee for processing contributions. WinRed reported handling almost $800,000 in contributions for Santos, so the Times calculated that the campaign should have paid WinRed around $33,000. Instead, the campaign reports having paid WinRed $206,000, leaving $173,000 unaccounted for. Similarly, NBC calculated that for Santos's campaign to have actually owed that money, it would have had to have raised $5.2 million through WinRed; it reported raising $1.7 million in total individual contributions from all sources.

The discrepancy might just have been the mistaken inclusion of fees paid to outside vendors through WinRed, a practice the platform explicitly warns against. Kappel told NBC that "the treasurer [seems to have had] access to little, if any, supporting documentation" when preparing Santos's FEC reports. "[This] might merely be another example of the campaign's poor accounting practices."

Misrepresentations in fundraising
Santos's campaign paid $50,000 in fees to a consultant who had called Republican donors falsely claiming to be Kevin McCarthy's chief of staff and asking them to support Santos. In mid-January 2023, McCarthy said though he had "some questions about it", he had "no idea" about the falsity of Santos's resume when he ran, nor that a Santos fundraiser had posed as McCarthy's chief of staff. Some contributors to Santos's campaign said they were motivated to give to him because of his supposed Wall Street experience or his claim to be Jewish, both later found to be fictitious, and felt cheated in the wake of those disclosures.

RedStone Strategies
RedStone Strategies, a super PAC supporting Santos in the race that told potential donors a month before the election that it had raised $800,000 and was seeking to raise another $700,000, did not register with the FEC as a campaign organization. It was thus not known who donated to RedStone or ran it; the Devolder Organization and one of Santos's former Harbor City coworkers who lived at the Merritt Island address are listed as officers of a similarly named concern in Florida records. There is no record that RedStone spent any money on advertising in support of Santos. It also described itself as a 501(c)(4) organization, which means that while it can spend on political advocacy as long as that is not its primary purpose, it cannot support candidates directly. Redstone listed a branch of a Wells Fargo bank on Merritt Island as its address.

RedStone received $110,000 in a series of 76 payments over 2021 from Tina Forte's campaign, whose treasurer was the same former Harbor City coworker of Santos's and a co-owner of RedStone along with Marks and the Devolder Organization. Forte's campaign's FEC reports have some issues as well, such as many unnamed donors and $14,000 in reimbursements to the candidate for unnamed personal expenses, along with the allegations from donors of unauthorized credit charges via WinRed.

Rise NY

In late 2020, after Santos had lost the election to Suozzi, Marks and Tiffany Santos established a PAC called Rise NY, which paid RedStone $6,000 in April 2022. It later raised money from many Santos donors who had exceeded the $2,900 limit for direct campaign contributions. PACs are allowed to receive unlimited contributions to candidates and parties, but cannot coordinate efforts with campaigns. Rise NY's Twitter account posted accounts of voter registration events and rallies it claimed to have organized during the campaign; Rise NY reported paying salaries to some Santos campaign staff, $10,000 to a company Marks runs, and a $20,000 salary to Tiffany Santos. It also reported multiple expenditures at Il Bacco, the Queens Italian restaurant where Santos's 2022 campaign spent $14,000, and at a gas station near Santos's Whitestone apartment. Newsday reported later that, for two months in 2021, Rise made Santos's $2,600 rent payments, and it later paid $1,800 for three tickets for Santos and two guests to attend a gala sponsored by the Liberty Education Forum, a group the PAC gave over $50,000. It also reported $6,500 in payments to Santos.

Andrew Intrater, the financier who had lost most of the $625,000 Santos persuaded him to invest in Harbor City, said his $175,000 contribution to Rise NY was underreported to the state by $95,000 until a later amended report. Later he learned that his contributions had amounted to 40 percent of the organization's funding. A $25,000 donation he made to RedStone Strategies, purportedly for a large television ad buy, was never reported to the FEC because RedStone had never registered with it.

Mother Jones reported at the end of February 2023 that despite no official connection to Rise, Santos regularly solicited contributions to it and in some cases personally delivered checks from it, including two for $62,500 each to the Nassau County and Town of Hempstead Republican committees, suggesting that he had some role with Rise. In late 2021, over $55,000 Santos raised by telling donors the money would be used to register voters was diverted to Outspoken Middle East, an LGBTQ-themed news platform aimed at that region of the world.

Outspoken founder Charles Moran said he had approached Santos asking for financial help; since the contribution was legal for Rise to have made, he accepted it. Richard Grenell, a prominent gay Republican who served as U.S. Ambassador to Germany during the Trump administration, was also involved with starting Outspoken; he spoke at a Santos fundraiser around the same time and formally endorsed Santos in July 2022. Intrater told Mother Jones that he had only learned from them about the diversion and that Santos had told him repeatedly during 2021 that contributions to Rise were being spent to build the Republican Party in New York.

Investigations and legal issues

House Ethics Committee
On January 10, 2023, two House Democrats from New York who have been critical of Santos, Ritchie Torres and Dan Goldman, filed an ethics complaint with the House Ethics Committee over Santos's financial disclosure reports; Santos denied wrongdoing.

On March 2, the House Ethics Committee announced a formal investigation into Santos. The committee's chairman and ranking member appointed a four-member investigative subcommittee, consisting of Representatives David Joyce (chair), Susan Wild (ranking member), John Rutherford, and Glenn Ivey. The investigative subcommittee was tasked with investigating whether Santos "engaged in unlawful activity with respect to his 2022 congressional campaign; failed to properly disclose required information on statements filed with the House; violated federal conflict of interest laws in connection with his role in a firm providing fiduciary services; and/or engaged in sexual misconduct towards an individual seeking employment in his congressional office."

Brazilian check fraud charges 

After obtaining his high school equivalency diploma, Santos spent time in Brazil. In 2008, he forged checks, stolen from a man his mother was caring for, to buy R$1,313 (about US$700) worth of clothing. When writing the checks, Santos presented identification bearing his photo but the check owner's name. The store owner became suspicious when the signatures on two checks did not match. Santos later admitted to the theft in a message to the store clerk on Orkut and confessed to police before he was charged with check fraud in 2010. The case was archived by a Brazilian court in 2013 because authorities there were unable to locate Santos. After the Brazilian charges became widely known in December 2022, Santos said, "I am not a criminal herenot here or in Brazil or any jurisdiction in the world."

In January 2023, Rio de Janeiro prosecutors announced that they would revive the fraud charges because Santos's whereabouts had become known.

Evictions and unpaid judgments 

Santos was evicted from rented Queens properties (in Jackson Heights, Whitestone, and Sunnyside) three times in the mid-2010s over unpaid rent. Yasser Revello recalls moving into the first apartment in December 2013 after befriending Santos shortly after moving to the city. It had only two bedrooms and a single bathroom; Santos shared it with his mother, sister, and later his boyfriend; Morey-Parker, an earlier roommate, recalls that eviction notices were sent every month.

Before he moved in, Santos promised to partition the living room so he could have private space to sleep, but Revello was told when he moved in that although the Santoses had bought the materials it turned out to be impossible to build the partition; Revello noted no sign that they had even attempted the work. Later they refused to share food or bottled water with him; Revello claims the family forced him out a month before his lease expired, so as retaliation he told the property manager about the extra people living in the apartment, which led to the eviction proceedings.

On audio recordings Santos is heard asking the judge to be allowed to reenter the apartment to collect his belongings and feed fish kept in a "very large tank"; Revello says the Santoses had no tank or fish during his time there. The landlady's lawyer also complains to the court that Santos was lying about a check he claimed to have sent her. When the judge suggested Santos apply for emergency rental assistance from the city, Santos said he would.

Morey-Parker lent Santos several thousand dollars he said he needed to move in with his boyfriend in September 2014. After Santos stopped responding to him, he filed a claim in Queens small claims court in 2015. Santos claimed that the money was a gift and had already been repaid, but the judge sided with Morey-Parker, ordering Santos to pay $5,000 plus interest. In December 2022, he told the Times that Santos never repaid him.

Santos signed a one-year lease on a single-family house in Whitestone in 2014. In 2023, his boyfriend, Pedro Vilarva, told the Times that he had dated Santos for several months before they moved in together; that Santos had claimed that he would get money from an investment he had done with Citigroup, so Vilarva paid most of the bills; and that Santos "never ever actually went to work". The relationship soured in early 2015 when Vilarva stopped believing Santos's promises that he would pay for a trip to Hawaii in order to propose marriage. After Vilarva came to believe Santos had taken his cell phone to pawn it, he searched the Internet for Santos's name and found the 2013 Brazilian charges against him, leading him to move out.

Santos remained in the house through November of that year, owing a month and a half's rent. His landlady filed for eviction, and he agreed to leave by December 24 and pay her $2,250 in back rent, telling the court that his mother's illness had drastically impacted his ability to work but he would soon be able to repay the money from "business loans". In mid-January 2016, he told Queens Housing Court, in a statement signed under oath, that he was robbed of the money on his way to pay the back rent, and that police were unable to take a report at the time, telling him to return later. There is no record he ever did. The next month, after the eviction became final, Santos registered to vote in Florida, where he was working for HotelsPro. He voted in that year's election in November, and then re-registered again in New York six days later.

In Santos's third eviction case, in 2017, a Queens court entered a civil judgment of $12,208 against him. Again, in housing court, he said he would seek emergency rental assistance. Santos told the Post that his mother's illness had forced his family into debt at the time; as of December 2022 he had yet to pay the rent he owed, saying he "completely forgot about it".

Friends of Pets United 

Santos has claimed that he "founded and ran" the Friends of Pets United (FOPU) charity from 2013 to 2018, and his campaign biography claimed that FOPU rescued over 2,500 animals. The claims are unsubstantiated, reported The New York Times, citing interviews with former volunteers and associates of Santos that described FOPU's "scattered efforts" and detailed that far fewer than 2,500 animals were saved.

The Times has found no official records that FOPU would have been required or expected to have. In addition to its lack of IRS certification as tax-exempt and state registrations as a charity, the New York State Department of Agriculture and Markets told the Times FOPU had never registered with it as a rescue organization, despite a requirement since September 2017 that all such entities in the states do so. The organization New York City contracts to provide animal-related services said that FOPU was not authorized to take dogs from city shelters and that it had no record of any dealings with FOPU.

Of his role in FOPU, Santos said in December 2022 that he "was the guy picking up poop, cleaning, getting people, doing campaigns online" and that there was "a broader group of folks who helped out" FOPU; in February 2023, he said that he "never handled the finances" of FOPU.

A New Jersey rescue operator who said Santos had placed a few dogs legitimately with her help grew suspicious of him when he repeatedly claimed throughout 2018 to be closing his organization down and needing a location to place FOPU's last few dogs; the rescue operator said she conversed with a friend who worked in animal rescue who shared similar experiences with Santos.

Theft charges 

In November 2017, Santos was charged with theft by deception in York County, Pennsylvania, regarding bad checks to dog breeders from his account. An Amish farmer told CNN that Santos, whom he described as "nervous and fidgety", arrived with a woman who seemed to be his assistant, told her to pick up two dogs and put them in the car they came in. He and Santos quickly agreed on the price; Santos insisted on writing a check when the farmer told him he would only take payment in cash, saying that he would not carry the amount of cash necessary around and that he could only pay with a check, which bounced, as the farmer had suspected it would.

Days after writing $15,125 in checks for "puppies", Santos and FOPU hosted an adoption event at a pet store with a variety of purebred dogs, according to the store's social media account and an event attendee. Tiffany Bogosian, Santos's lawyer friend from his youth, assisted in getting the charges dropped after Santos told her that his checkbook had been stolen in 2017 and he had received an extradition warrant from Pennsylvania at his New York address in 2020. She argued that none of the signatures on the checks matched Santos's and that they were different from each other. Bogosian said Santos told her he had also told Pennsylvania prosecutors he "worked for the SEC". The case against Santos was dismissed in May 2021, after prosecutors allowed it and "satisfaction has been made to the aggrieved person", with the farmer who lodged a police report ultimately being paid by Santos. Santos's record was expunged in November 2021, with no further detail on this provided by the York County District Court. But in February 2023, The Washington Post reported that three other Amish dog breeders alleged that they did not file police reports against Santos and were never paid.

Allegations of mishandling funds
Several people have alleged that Santos mishandled funds raised to assist animals.
 In January 2023, retired U.S. Navy veteran Richard Osthoff and retired police officer Michael Boll accused Santos of having in the past stolen funds donated to a GoFundMe fundraiser established to raise money for surgery to remove a life-threatening stomach tumor from Osthoff's service dog. In May 2016, Osthoff was homeless and was told the dog's surgery would cost $3,000. A veterinary technician recommended that he contact the owner of FOPU, Anthony Devolder, who then set up the GoFundMe page. After the fundraiser had reached its goal of $3,000 in June, Devolder closed it and withdrew the money. Osthoff, Boll, and GoFundMe received no funds, and the dog died in January 2017. GoFundMe banned Santos, who had organized the fundraiser, at the end of 2016. George Devolder's Facebook page featured a post soliciting funds, supposedly for the cancer surgery, and linking to the GoFundMe page. The veterinarian Santos told Osthoff to use said the tumor was inoperable; Santos then said he would use Sapphire's funds "for other dogs" because Osthoff "didn't do things my way", according to Osthoff. Osthoff showed texts to Patch and CNN in which Osthoff told Santos, "My dog is going to die", and Santos replied that since "Sapphire is not a candidate for this surgery the funds are moved to the next animal in need", while also stating that FOPU was "audited" and had the "highest standards of integrity". Boll said that he contacted Santos and instructed Santos to give Osthoff the money or buy another dog for Osthoff, but Santos was "totally uncooperative". GoFundMe confirmed that it "received a report of an issue with this fundraiser [for Sapphire] in late 2016" and so "sought proof of the delivery of funds from the organizer", but the "organizer failed to respond, which led to the fundraiser being removed and the email associated with that account prohibited from further use on our platform." Sapphire died in January 2017. Santos denied swindling Osthoff. The FBI is investigating Osthoff's allegations.
 The veterinary technician who recommended Santos to Osthoff said that Santos later offered to raise funds to repair her farm in New Jersey so that it could be used for animal rescue. FOPU held a 2017 fundraiser event, charging $50 per attendee, eventually raising $2,165, with Santos controlling the money. The veterinary technician said that Santos was elusive and never gave her any of the proceeds, instead only giving excuses for not transferring the money.
 The owner of a Staten Island pet store told the Times that, after a successful series of fundraisers, Santos, whom the store owner knew under the name Anthony Devolder, asked him to make the check out to him personally rather than FOPU. The owner refused, but later saw that on the payee line of the canceled check, FOPU had been crossed out and replaced with "Anthony Devolder".
 A pet rescue operator in the Bronx told the Times that after Santos had boasted of his Wall Street experience and connections to her to assure her he could raise thousands of dollars for her organization, he held a fundraiser in March 2017 and then sent her a check for $400. She stopped working with him, believing he was either overpromising or skimming.

Alleged involvement in credit-card-skimming scheme

CBS has reported that Santos's name came up in a 2017 international credit card skimming scheme perpetrated in Seattle by Brazilians. After Gustavo Ribeiro Trelha, a Brazilian living in Orlando, was arrested using a card skimmer at an automatic teller machine, a search of his car found an empty FedEx box with the return address of one of Santos's former residences in Winter Park, which he was later reported to have jointly leased with Santos, the same one given on a Florida traffic ticket issued to Santos in October 2016. CBS later reported that two Secret Service agents interviewed Santos in New York; he voluntarily surrendered two of his cellphones to them. The case remains open, but Santos has not been identified as a suspect.

The defense sentencing memo in the case included a letter from Trelha's purported girlfriend, "Leide Santos", writing that "she" had started a business with him in Florida. No record of anyone by that name was found. When Bogosian was assisting him with the Pennylvania FOPU case, she told authorities that Santos had assisted Seattle police as an informant in that case, and he had initially believed the warrant was related to it.

Politico reported later that Santos flew out to Seattle to appear at Trelha's arraignment, saying they were family friends through their parents. Trelha told the website that that was not true, that in fact he had met Santos the year before through a Facebook group for Brazilians living in the Orlando area, and that his own mother had died in 2012. Santos told the court that he had rented a long-term Airbnb in Seattle for Trelha to stay in during the trial. When the judge asked Santos what he did for a living, he called himself an "aspiring politician" who worked for Goldman Sachs, a lie he later repeated when running for office.

After the story was reported in 2023, Trelha made a sworn declaration to the FBI that he had committed the crime at the urging of Santos, who had also taught him how to set up the skimmer and camera necessary to steal passwords and how to clone ATM and credit cards. The two had an agreement to split the proceeds, Trelha said, but after his arrest Santos kept all the money for himself, reneging on a promise to hire a top defense lawyer and pay Trelha's bail. At the time he said he declined to tell federal authorities as Santos had threatened to report his Orlando roommates to immigration authorities as they were in the U.S. illegally.

Santos told reporters the day after Politico reported the declaration that he was innocent. "Never did anything of criminal activity, and I have no mastermind event." He said he had only met Trelha "a couple of times in my life" and that he had willingly assisted every law enforcement agency that contacted him: "Got information for them. Got everybody arrested and deported."

Allegations of theft from roommates
Two of Santos's former roommates accused him of stealing personal effects, including a $520 Burberry scarf he wore to a January 5, 2021, "Stop the Steal" rally, and said that expensive dress shirts, phones and checks went missing while Santos was living with them. Yasser Revello, who lived with Santos, his mother, sister and boyfriend in 2013–14, claimed the Santos family kept his dresser when he moved out.

Traffic and parking violations
In February 2023, CBS News reported on unpaid fines for traffic violations since 2016 that Santos may have committed. New York City records showed that a car with a license plate registered to Santos was cited for 29 traffic violations from 2016 to 2019, including red-light violations, toll violations and double parking, of which 17 were paid and 12 unpaid, with over $2,100 still owed. Florida records showed that a car registered to Santos was cited for six traffic violations in 2016 and 2017, of which four toll violations totaling nearly $1,300 were unpaid, while two red-light violations were paid. The Times had previously reported that the vulnerability study Santos's campaign did in late 2021 found that his Florida driver's license had been suspended. The New York Post reported that a Nissan Rogue car Santos frequently drove was cited for speeding five times after he was elected in November 2022, and that four of the speeding citations were in school zones.

Sexual harassment allegations
Also in February 2023, Derek Myers, the prospective staffer who secretly recorded Santos admitting "errors of judgment" in making some of his claims, filed a sexual harassment complaint against Santos with the House Ethics Committee, alleging Santos had touched his groin inappropriately while inviting him out to a karaoke bar and telling Myers that his husband was out of town. Myers also alleged that Santos had violated House rules by having him work as a volunteer for a week before his paperwork was processed.

Personal life 
Santos is openly gay. Santos was married to a woman from 2012 to 2019, despite previously being out, but lived with men he was involved with from 2013 on. In October 2022, he told the media: "I am openly gay, have never had an issue with my sexual identity in the past decade". Two months later, he said in another interview, "I did marry young, and I married a young woman at the time, and we pretty much were in love". Friends, former coworkers and roommates Santos has had throughout his adult life say that he has never left any doubt that he was gay.

He did not publicly acknowledge his marriage to a woman, a Brazilian national, until it was reported in December 2022; that month he told the New York Post, "I dated women in the past. I married a woman", adding that he was "OK with my sexuality. People change."

Records show that a filing to dissolve the marriage in May 2013 was withdrawn in December. Four months later, Santos filed a family-based immigration petition on his wife's behalf; it was approved in July, typically seen as a sign that United States Citizenship and Immigration Services believes the marriage is valid. His wife filed for the removal of conditions in July 2016 and was granted her green card in October 2017. Five years later, she became a U.S. citizen.

Malcolm L. Lazin, a former federal prosecutor and LGBT-rights activist, filed complaints with the House Ethics Committee and the Office of Congressional Ethics in February 2023 asking that Santos's marriage be investigated as a possible green card marriage entered into solely so that his wife might gain legal residence in the U.S., and later citizenship. He cited news reports that Santos had lived apart from his wife, in relationships with multiple men, one of whom he proposed to, and another account that he had offered to marry one so he might be able to stay in the country.

In 2020, Santos said he was living with a partner named Matheus (or Matt), whom he has subsequently called his husband.

Santos has stated that he has four dogs. He enjoys karaoke.

Electoral history

In popular culture 
In early 2023, a number of late-night shows parodied Santos after widespread media coverage of his false biographical statements. Saturday Night Live featured Bowen Yang as Santos in both the cold open and Weekend Update segments of its January 21, 2023, episode. Yang reprised the role on the March 11 episode during a cold open that parodied the red carpet at the 2023 Oscars, where he would claim to be Tom Cruise.

Comedian Jon Lovitz portrayed Santos on The Tonight Show Starring Jimmy Fallon, which resulted in a brief Twitter feud between the two. Harvey Guillén and Nelson Franklin parodied Santos on The Late Show With Stephen Colbert and Jimmy Kimmel Live, respectively.

While hosting the 95th Academy Awards on March 12, 2023, Jimmy Kimmel joked that Santos was the "last directing team to win an Oscar."

See also 
 Anna Paulina Luna, Florida congresswoman elected in 2022 also found to have significantly misrepresented her personal history and family background
 Andy Ogles, Tennessee congressman elected in 2022 also found to have significantly misrepresented his personal history
 Dan Johnson, Kentucky state legislator who committed suicide in 2017 after fabrications about his past were revealed
 Douglas R. Stringfellow, one-term Utah congressman known for having lied extensively about his past

Notes

References

External links 

 
 Representative George Santos official U.S. House website
 George Santos for Congress
 
 Ballotpedia candidate profile – 2022 Candidate Connection survey answers (Archive at Archive.org)

 

|-

1988 births
2022 controversies in the United States
2023 controversies in the United States
21st-century American politicians
American Catholics
American people of Belgian descent
American politicians of Brazilian descent
Candidates in the 2020 United States elections
Gay politicians
Hispanic and Latino American members of the United States Congress
Latino conservatism in the United States
LGBT Hispanic and Latino American people
LGBT members of the United States Congress
LGBT conservatism in the United States
Living people
New York (state) Republicans
People from Huntington, New York
People from Jackson Heights, Queens
People from Whitestone, Queens
People who fabricated academic degrees
Place of birth missing (living people)
Political controversies in the United States
Political scandals in the United States
Politicians from Queens, New York
Protesters in or near the January 6 United States Capitol attack
Republican Party members of the United States House of Representatives from New York (state)